The Giro Media Blenio is an annual road running event over 10 kilometres which takes place in April in the village of Dongio, Switzerland. It was created in honour of Markus Ryffel's silver medal in the 5000 metres at the 1984 Los Angeles Olympics.

The event, held in the district of Blenio, is divided into four race types. The 10 km Grand Prix is an elite, open class men's race, while the Giro provides an alternate 10 km for amateur fun runners. Shorter races are offered for young runners in the Mini Giro section and a separate race is held for people wishing to complete the course by walking and Nordic walking. The main 10 km race was included on the Post-Cup series of Swiss races for its 25th anniversary in 2009.

The route for the elite Grand Prix race is a 1.25 km circuit around the streets of Dongio, which athletes complete eight times in the course of the race. The fun run is a larger circuit, which passes the nearby settlements of Roccabella, Motto and Ludiano. A total of 1000 runners (761 men and 229 women) took part in the Giro in 2011, while more than 1500 people participated in the day's other events.

The Giro Media Blenio had its inaugural edition in 1985 and for its first nine years it featured an 11 km men's race and an 8 km race for women. From 1994 to 2006 the distances were set at 10 km for men and 5 km for women, but the women's race was dropped from the programme from 2007 onwards. Winners of the men's elite race include Haile Gebrselassie, Olympic champion Khalid Skah and World Cross Country Champions Paul Tergat and William Sigei. On the women's side, the first edition was won by Ellen Wessinghage, a former mile run world record holder, and she was later joined by 2003 world champion Berhane Adere, Olympic medallist Isabella Ochichi and world medallist Priscah Jepleting Cherono.

Past elite winners

Key:

References

List of winners
Franco Civai et al. (2011-04-25). Giro Media Blenio 10 km + 5 km. Association of Road Racing Statisticians. Retrieved on 2011-04-29.

External links
Official website 

10K runs
Recurring sporting events established in 1985
Athletics competitions in Switzerland
Sport in Ticino
Spring (season) events in Switzerland
1985 establishments in Switzerland